was an airline based in Tokoname, Aichi Prefecture, Japan. It operated passenger services as All Nippon Airways (ANA) flights from its main base is Chūbu Centrair International Airport near Nagoya.   On October 1, 2010, Air Central, Air Next and Air Nippon Network were merged and rebranded as ANA Wings.

History 

In 1953, Nakanihon Air Service (NAS) was founded near Nagoya Airport (now Nagoya Airfield). Its major shareholders included Nagoya Railroad and ANA. Its core business was general aviation, including scenic and charter flights, aerial photography and helicopter services. It still operates as a general aviation company.

Nakanihon Airlines, was founded on May 12, 1988. It was headquartered in Nagoya Airport and was a joint venture between Nagoya Railroad and ANA. Commuter services began operations on 23 April 1991.

On February 17, 2005, NAL was renamed to the current name and was relocated to Chubu Centrair International Airport. The flight schedules were amended for convenience of domestic and international flight changeover there. These moves were made for ANA's wish to feed international flights from Centrair operated by ANA and its Star Alliance partners.

Destinations 
As of April 2007, Air Central served the following destinations on the Japanese islands of Honshū, Shikoku and Kyūshū.

Between Nagoya-Centrair and:
Fukuoka Airport (FUK), Fukuoka, Fukuoka
Fukushima Airport (FKS), Tamakawa, Fukushima near Koriyama
Matsuyama Airport (MYJ), Matsuyama, Ehime
Narita International Airport (NRT), Chiba Prefecture, 70 kilometres from Tokyo
Niigata Airport (KIJ), Niigata, Niigata
Tokushima Airport (TKS), Matsushige, Tokushima near
Tokushima city
Yonago Airport (Miho Airbase YGJ), Sakaiminato, Tottori near Yonago

Between Osaka International Airport (ITM) Itami, Ōsaka and:
Kochi Airport (KCZ), Nankoku, Kōchi
Matsuyama Airport
Niigata Airport

Between Fukuoka Airport and:
Goto-Fukue Airport (FUJ), Gotō, Nagasaki
Tsushima Airport (TSJ), Tsushima, Nagasaki

It also operated the Sendai Airport (SDJ), near Sendai, Miyagi to Narita International Airport (NRT) route.

Fleet 

The Air Central fleet included (as of March 2007):
3 Fokker 50 (All have been repainted in the livery of ANA prior to retirement)
2 Bombardier Dash 8 Q400 (progressively leased and carrying the livery of ANA which is later transferred to ANA Wings)

References

External links
 Air Central

Defunct airlines of Japan
All Nippon Airways
Airlines established in 1988
Airlines disestablished in 2010
Companies based in Aichi Prefecture
Japanese companies established in 1988
Japanese companies disestablished in 2010